The 40th Infantry Division ("Sunburst Division") is a modular division of the United States Army. Following the army's modularization the division has become a four-brigade combat team with National Guardsmen from throughout the Pacific/Western United States and Oceania. Its division headquarters is located at Los Alamitos Joint Forces Training Base in Los Alamitos, California.

After seeing service in World War I as a depot division, it was reorganized as the National Guard division for California, Nevada, and Utah, before seeing service in the Pacific Theatre of World War II. Later, the division served in Korea and some of its units were designated for Vietnam. The division was later reorganized redesigned as a National Guard unit completely within California.  Later reorganizations included units from other states.  As currently configured, the 40th Infantry Division has oversight and responsibility for the training and readiness of units in California, Oregon, Hawaii, Arizona, Washington, Alaska, New Mexico, Indiana, Nebraska, Nevada, Mississippi, Utah, Guam, and the Northern Mariana Islands.

Service record 
Constituted on 18 July 1917 following the American entry into World War I, the 40th Infantry Division was organized at Camp Kearny, near San Diego, California, on 16 September, originally designated as the 19th Division. It was composed of National Guard units from the states of Arizona, California, Colorado, Nevada, New Mexico, and Utah.

World War I
It was sent overseas on 3 August 1918 and redesignated as the 6th Depot Division; received, equipped, trained, and forwarded replacements. Major General Frederick S. Strong was assigned as commander on 25 August 1917, but was replaced less than a month later by Brigadier General G. H. Cameron on 18 September 1917.

The division then saw a rapid turnover of leaders – Brigadier General L. S. Lyon (19 November 1917), Brigadier General G. H. Cameron (23 November 1917), Brigadier General L. S. Lyon (6 December 1917) and then Major General F. S. Strong again on 8 December 1917.

Order of battle

Headquarters, 40th Division
79th Infantry Brigade
157th Infantry Regiment (former 1st Colorado Infantry, and 1st Colorado Cavalry less band and Troop E)
158th Infantry Regiment (former 1st Arizona Infantry)
144th Machine Gun Battalion (former 3rd Battalion and Machine Gun Company, 1st New Mexico Infantry) 
80th Infantry Brigade
159th Infantry Regiment (former 5th California Infantry, and 2nd California Infantry less band, 2nd Battalion, and Companies L and M)
160th Infantry Regiment (former 7th California Infantry, and 2nd Battalion and Companies L and M, 2nd California Infantry)
145th Machine Gun Battalion (former Troops A, B, and C and Machine Gun Troop, 1st Separate Squadron California Cavalry)
65th Field Artillery Brigade
143rd Field Artillery Regiment (75 mm) (former 1st California Field Artillery)
144th Field Artillery Regiment (155 mm) (former 2nd California Field Artillery)
145th Field Artillery Regiment (4.7") (former 1st Utah Field Artillery)
115th Trench Mortar Battery (former Machine Gun Company, 2nd Colorado Infantry)
143rd Machine Gun Battalion (former 1st and 2nd Battalions, 1st New Mexico Infantry)
115th Engineer Regiment (former 1st Battalion, Colorado Engineers, and Troop E, 1st Colorado Cavalry)
115th Field Signal Battalion (former Company B, California Signal Corps and Company B, Colorado Signal Corps)
Headquarters Troop, 40th Division (former Troop D, 1st California Cavalry)
115th Train Headquarters and Military Police (former Headquarters, Headquarters Company less band, and Supply Company, 1st New Mexico Infantry)
115th Ammunition Train (former Headquarters, Headquarters Company less band, and 2nd and 3rd Battalions, 1st Colorado Infantry)
115th Supply Train (former Supply Company and 1st Battalion, 1st Colorado Infantry)
115th Engineer Train (former 1st Colorado Engineer Train)
115th Sanitary Train
157th, 158th, 159th, and 160th Ambulance Companies and Field Hospitals (former California Ambulance Companies No. 1 and 2 and Field Hospital Companies No. 1 and 2, and Utah Field Hospital No. 1)

When the division arrived in France in August 1918, the Imperial German Army had just completed a series of offensives that started on 21 March and ended on 15 July 1918. It was decided that the new divisions would be used as depot divisions, supplying fresh troops to the more experienced combat divisions. By the time the war was over in November 1918, due to the Armistice with Germany, the 40th Division had provided over 27,000 replacements to the 26th, 28th, 32nd, 77th, 80th, 81st, 82nd, and 89th Divisions. Thus the division as a whole did not serve in combat, but many division personnel fought, notably Captain Nelson Miles Holderman, who received the Medal of Honor for his actions in the Meuse–Argonne offensive. The division returned to the United States on 30 June 1919 where it was deactivated.

The division was reconstituted on 18 June 1926 with its headquarters in Berkeley. The division was reorganized with its units coming from California, Nevada, and Utah; units from Arizona, Colorado, and New Mexico went to the new 45th Division. In 1937, the division headquarters was moved to Los Angeles.

World War II

Commanders
Major General Walter P. Story (March–September 1941)
Major General Ernest J. Dawley (September 1941 – April 1942)
Major General Rapp Brush (April 1942 – July 1945)
Brigadier General Donald J. Myers (July 1945 to inactivation)

Combat chronicle
The 40th Infantry Division was ordered into federal service on 3 March 1941. It was at the time a National Guard division from the California, Nevada Army National Guard, and Utah Army National Guards. 
In February 1942, the 40th Infantry Division was reorganized from a 'square', two-brigade, four-regiment division to a three-regiment division without any intermediate brigade headquarters. Thus the 79th and 80th Infantry Brigades were inactivated.

The division departed for overseas service on 23 August 1942. The division's first overseas assignment was the defense of the outer Hawaiian Islands, where it arrived in September 1942. Training continued as defensive positions were improved and maintained. In July 1943, the division was concentrated on Oahu, and relieved the 24th Infantry Division of the defense of the North Sector. Relieved of the North Sector in October 1943, the 40th entered upon a period of intensive amphibious and jungle training. On 20 December 1943, the first units left for Guadalcanal, and by mid-January 1944, movement was completed, and the division prepared for its first combat assignment. On 24 April 1944, it left Guadalcanal for New Britain. The regiments of the division took positions at Talasea on the northern side of the island, at Arawe on the southern side, and at near the western end. Neutralization of the enemy was effected by patrols. No major battle was fought. Heavy rain and mud were constant problems.

The 40th was relieved of missions on New Britain on 27 November 1944 by the Australian 5th Division, and began training for the Luzon landing. Sailing from Borgen Bay on 9 December 1944, the division made an assault landing at Lingayen, Luzon, under command of XIV Corps, on 9 January 1945. Seizing Lingayen airfield, the division occupied Bolinao Peninsula and San Miguel, and advanced toward Manila, include the Filipino regular and constable force of the Philippine Commonwealth Army and Philippine Constabulary were recaptured areas around in Luzon at the mainland, running into heavy fighting in the Fort Stotsenburg area and the Bambam Hills. Snake Hill and Storm King Mountain were taken in February and the 40th was relieved, 2 March. Leaving Luzon on 15 March 1945 to cut behind the Japanese, the division landed on Panay Island on the 18th and knocked out Japanese resistance within ten days, seizing airfields at Cabatuan and Mandurriao. On 29 March, it landed at Pulupandan, Negros Occidental, advanced through Bacolod toward Talisay, which it secured by 2 April 1945. After mopping up on Negros Island, the division returned to Panay in June and July 1945.

Lt. Col. Ryoichi Tozuka, the commander of the Imperial Japanese Army in Panay Island, signed the document of surrender at Cabatuan Airfield, located in Cabatuan, Iloilo, Panay Island, Philippines, on September 2, 1945, the same day as the surrender signing in Japan aboard the U.S.S. Missouri. This was accepted by Col. Raymond G. Stanton, comdg the 160th U.S. Infantry regiment, and was attended by Rear Admiral Ralph O. Davis, comdg the U.S. Navy's 13th Amphibious Group, and by Brig. Gen. Donald J. Myers, comdg the 40th Infantry Division. The 13th Amphibious Group was tasked to transport the 40th U.S. Infantry Division to Korea.

In September 1945, the division moved to Korea for occupation duty. The division returned to the U.S. on 7 April 1946 and was reportedly inactivated the same day.

During the war various regiments were assigned to the division, these included the 108th, 159th, 160th, 184th, 185th, and 503d, however no more than three regiments were assigned to the division at any one time. World War II honors for the division included three Distinguished Unit Citations. Awards to its men included 1 Medal of Honor, 12 Distinguished Service Crosses, 1 Distinguished Service Medal, 245 Silver Stars, 21 Legions of Merit, 30 Soldier's Medals, 1,036 Bronze Stars, and 57 Air Medals.

Order of battle, 1942-1945

 Headquarters, 40th Infantry Division
 108th Infantry Regiment (assigned to division from 1 September 1942)
 159th Infantry Regiment (relieved from division on 29 September 1941)
 160th Infantry Regiment (absent from division from 1 September 1942 to 25 December 1943)
 165th Infantry Regiment (assigned to division from 3 September to 30 October 1942)
 184th Infantry Regiment (relieved from division on 16 June 1942)
 185th Infantry Regiment
 Headquarters and Headquarters Battery, 40th Infantry Division Artillery
 143rd Field Artillery Battalion (105 mm)
 164th Field Artillery Battalion (105 mm)
 213th Field Artillery Battalion (105 mm)
 222nd Field Artillery Battalion (155 mm)
 115th Engineer Combat Battalion
 115th Medical Battalion
 40th Cavalry Reconnaissance Troop (Mechanized)
 Headquarters, Special Troops, 40th Infantry Division
 Headquarters Company, 40th Infantry Division
 740th Ordnance Light Maintenance Company
 40th Quartermaster Company
 40th Signal Company
 Military Police Platoon
 Band
 40th Counterintelligence Corps Detachment

Casualties

Total battle casualties: 3,025
Killed in action: 614
Wounded in action: 2,407
Missing in action: 3
Prisoner of war: 1

Korean War

Commanders
Major General Daniel H. Hudelson (2 Dec 1947 to 1 September 1952)
Major General Joseph P. Cleland (1952 to 1953)
Major General Ridgely Gaither (1953 to 1954)

Combat chronicle
On 1 September 1950, the 40th Infantry Division was again called into active federal service for the Korean War. Shipping out of Oakland and San Francisco, California in late March 1951, the division deployed to Japan for training. For the next nine months, they participated in amphibious, air transportability, and live fire training from Mount Fuji to Sendai. On 23 December, the division received alert orders to move to Korea. The division moved to Korea in January 1952. After additional training, the division moved north in February 1952, where it relieved the 24th Infantry Division on the battle line. At the time the division consisted of the 160th, 223rd, and 224th Infantry Regiments, and smaller non-regiment-sized units.

In Korea, the 40th Infantry Division participated in the battles of Sandbag Castle and Heartbreak Ridge. In these campaigns, the division suffered 1,180 casualties, including 311 who were killed in action, and 47 who later died from wounds received in action. Total division casualties in Korea included 376 killed in action, 1,457 wounded in action, and 47 dead of wounds. After the division was sent back to Japan, its time in Korea was commemorated by the commissioning of a punchbowl created by a local silversmith, by some accounts made up of the melted down Combat Infantryman Badges of the divisions veterans, with the geography of Heartbreak Ridge etched inside the bowl. It was used at ceremonial functions until it was stolen, and was subsequently bought at a garage sale by a married couple, who kept it for 18 years. It was then recovered and put on display at the division headquarters.  It is now displayed at the California State Military Museum, and is registered in the National Archives.

Three members of the division's 223rd Infantry Regiment were awarded the Medal of Honor for their actions during the Korean War: David B. Bleak, Gilbert G. Collier and Clifton T. Speicher. David Hackworth did a combat tour as company commander of E Company (Heavy Weapons) 1st Battalion 223rd Infantry Regiment and F Company 2nd Battalion 223rd Infantry Regiment in Korea with the division, when it was under the command of Major General Joseph P. Cleland.

After its return from the Korean War, the division was reorganized on 1 July 1954 as the 40th Armored Division. It had three combat commands (A, B, and C) in 1956.

Cold War 
The following infantry regimental units comprised elements of the division from 1959 until 2000: 1-158th (1959–1967), 1-159th (1974–1976), 2–159th (1974–2000) 160th (1974–2000). In 1960, the Division combat units were reorganized under the Combat Arms Regimental Systems (CARS), and then in 1963, was reorganized under the Reorganization Objective Army Divisions (ROAD) concept which changed the combat commands to brigades.

On 13 August 1965, Lieutenant Governor Glenn M. Anderson called out elements of the division to put down the Watts Riots, at the request of Los Angeles Police Chief William H. Parker. The absence of Governor Pat Brown vested gubernatorial authority in Anderson.

On 1 December 1967, a major reorganization of the National Guard reduced the Guard to eight combat divisions, the 40th Armored Division being one of the casualties. On 29 January 1968, the division was eliminated and the 40th Infantry Brigade and 40th Armored Brigade were organized.

On 13 January 1974, the California Army National Guard was reorganized. The 40th and 49th Infantry and the 40th Armored Brigades were inactivated and the 40th Infantry Division was reformed.

Like most reserve component units of the Army, the division sat out the Vietnam War, being left unmobilized, apart from its Aviation Company. In January 1968 the company had been redesignated the 40th Aviation Company, having been previously designated the 29th Aviation Company, part of the 29th Infantry Brigade homebased in Hawaii. The 40th Aviation Company did one tour in South Vietnam. It was in active federal service from May 1968 to December 1969.

In January 1974 Major General Charles A. Ott, Jr. was appointed commander of the division, and he served until accepting appointment as Director of the Army National Guard at the National Guard Bureau later that year.

On 30 September 1986, the division's Aviation Brigade was organized and federally recognized at Fresno. In 1987 the division's aviation units were reorganized, and the 140th Aviation Regiment was established.

From 1986 until 1995, the division's CAPSTONE wartime organizational structure included the 140th Military Intelligence Battalion (CEWI) (HD). Allocated to the United States Army Reserve in peacetime, the mission of the battalion was to provide the division commander and G-2 with electronic warfare intelligence and analysis, as well limited counterintelligence/interrogation support and long range surveillance. The battalion's long-range surveillance detachment was stripped from the battalion in peacetime and allocated to the California Army National Guard.

Post Cold War 
The 40th Infantry Division was not deployed in the Persian Gulf War.

On 29 April 1992, Governor Pete Wilson ordered elements of the 40th Infantry Division to duty to put down the so-called "Rodney King" riots. The 40th ID responded quickly by calling up some 2,000 soldiers, but could not get them to the city until nearly twenty-four hours had passed, due to a lack of proper equipment, training, and available ammunition, which had to be picked up from Camp Roberts, California (near Paso Robles). Initially, they only secured areas previously cleared of rioters by police. Later, they actively ran patrols, maintained checkpoints, and provided firepower for law enforcement. By 1 May, the call-up had increased to 4,000 soldiers continuing to move into the city in Humvees, who were later federalized under Title 10 USC by President George H. W. Bush.

In 1994, the division was made of three brigades, an aviation brigade, an engineer brigade, a division artillery brigade, and other associated units. Associated regiments included the 160th Infantry, 185th Armor, 221st Armor (Nevada), 159th Infantry, 184th Infantry, 149th Armor, 18th Cavalry, 140th Aviation, 143d Field Artillery, and 144th Field Artillery.

On 17 January 1994, Governor Pete Wilson activated the 40th Infantry Division (M) to respond to the aftermath of the Northridge earthquake, and emergency services were up and running within five hours of the quake.

In November 1997, Battery F (TA), 144th Field Artillery Regiment, represented the state of California in Bosnia. During this deployment, Battery F conducted Firefinder counter-battery radar operations, convoys and base security all with little to no armor, with a high threat of mine strikes and ambushes. Most drivers exceeded 21,000 kilometres (13,000 miles) during the seven months in country.

In November 2000, Battery F was again called to duty for its expertise in the Kosovo region.

Until Battery F's arrival in Afghanistan, radar operations were virtually unknown and uncared for. Nevertheless, the unit quickly became a very important resource and a leading factor in base defense operations.

Operation Freedom's Sentinel
The 40th ID deployed to Afghanistan in September 2017 in support of Operation Freedom's Sentinel.  Members of the 40th ID form the headquarters staff of Train, Advise, and Assist Command South which was commanded by Brig. Gen. John W. Lathrop.  This is the unit's "first combat deployment since the Korean War." In June 2018, authority of the command was transferred to Brig. Gen. Jeffrey Smiley who took command with a new group of 40th ID Soldiers; in October 2018, Smiley was injured during an insider attack, which resulted in the death of the police chief of Kandahar.

Current Structure

 
The 40th Infantry Division (Mechanized) is commanded by Major General Michael J. Leeney, with Command Sergeant Major Refugio Rosas Jr. serving as the Division Command Sergeant Major.
The 40th Infantry Division exercises training and readiness oversight of the following units consisting of a division headquarters battalion, a special troops battalion, three infantry brigade combat teams and a combat aviation brigade along with several attached units :
  Headquarters and Headquarters Battalion
  Special Troops Battalion
 29th Infantry Brigade Combat Team (BCT) (HI NG)
 Headquarters and Headquarters Company (HHC)
  1st Squadron, 299th Cavalry Regiment 
  1st Battalion, 158th Infantry Regiment (AZ NG)
 1st Battalion, 294th Infantry Regiment (GU NG)
  1st Battalion, 297th Infantry Regiment (AK NG)
 1st Battalion, 487th Field Artillery Regiment (FAR)
 227th Brigade Engineer Battalion (BEB)
 29th Brigade Support Battalion (BSB)
 41st Infantry BCT (OR NG)
 HHC
  1st Squadron, 303rd Cavalry Regiment (WA NG)
  2nd Battalion, 162d Infantry Regiment
  1st Battalion, 186th Infantry Regiment
  1st Battalion, 200th Infantry Regiment (NM NG)
  2d Battalion, 218th FAR
 741st BEB
  141st BSB
 79th Infantry BCT (CA NG)
 79th IBCT's HHC
 1st Squadron, 18th Cavalry Regiment
 1st Battalion, 184th Infantry Regiment
 1st Battalion, 160th Infantry Regiment
 1st Battalion, 65th Infantry Regiment
 1st Battalion, 143d FAR
 578th BEB
 40th BSB
 Combat Aviation Brigade, 40th Infantry Division
 HHC
  1st Battalion (General Support), 168th Aviation Regiment (WA NG)
  1st Battalion (Assault), 140th Aviation Regiment
  3rd Battalion (Support and Security), 140th Aviation Regiment
  1st Battalion (Attack/Recon), 211th Aviation Regiment (UT NG)
 640th Aviation Support Battalion
Associated units
  224th Sustainment Brigade
  224th SB's HHC
 Special Troops Battalion
 746th Combat Sustainment Support Battalion
  1st Battalion, 144th FAR

In July 2006, as part of the Army National Guard's modularization process, the 40th Infantry Division reorganized into four brigade combat teams and one aviation brigade. National Guard units from California, Oregon, Hawaii, Arizona, Washington, Alaska, New Mexico, Indiana, Nebraska, Utah and Guam were part of the 40th Infantry Division. On 3 December 2016 the 81st Stryker Brigade Combat Team left the division and joined the 7th Infantry Division as an associate unit of the 2nd Infantry Division.

Attached units
 65th Field Artillery Brigade (UT NG)
 297th Battlefield Surveillance Brigade (AK NG)(Reorganized and redesignated as the 297th Regional Support Group)

Symbols 
Nickname: Sunshine/Sunburst Division (official); Flaming Assholes (unofficial).
Shoulder patch: A dark blue diamond on which, in yellow, is the sun with 12 rays; the patch is worn diagonally.
Association: 40th Infantry Division Association

The semi-sunburst was suggested as the unit's shoulder sleeve insignia, and represents the division's home of Southern California. The demi fleur-de-lis symbolizes service in France during World War I. The outer rim of the sun rays refers to the Philippine Presidential Unit Citation award. The red arrowhead alludes to firepower of the division and represents their assault landing at Luzon in World War II. The Torri gate, a symbol of the Far East, refers to the award of the Republic of Korea Presidential Unit Citation.

The unofficial nickname came from the Korean War era when the unit was training in Japan. It was a combined result of disparaging remarks made by Army regulars about the National Guard division and the appearance of the unit shoulder sleeve insignia. The California Guardsmen took to their new nickname with a soldier's sense of humor, and turned it into a rallying symbol.

See also
Edward C. Meyer
Charles A. Ott Jr.
Thomas K. Turnage
Laura Yeager

References

Further reading
The Army Almanac: A Book of Facts Concerning the Army of the United States U.S. Government Printing Office, 1950 reproduced at CMH

External links

California National Guard, Fortieth Infantry Division (Mechanized)
40th Infantry Division Insignia at California State Military Museum

040th Infantry Division, U.S.
Infantry Division, U.S. 040
Divisions of the United States Army National Guard
Military units and formations in California
USInfDiv040
Infantry divisions of the United States Army in World War II
Military units and formations established in 1917
United States Army divisions of World War I